This is a list of banking crises. A banking crisis is a financial crisis that affects banking activity. Banking crises include bank runs, which affect single banks; banking panics, which affect many banks; and systemic banking crises, in which a country experiences many defaults and financial institutions and corporations face great difficulties repaying contracts. A banking crisis is marked by bank runs that lead to the demise of financial institutions, or by the demise of a financial institution that starts a string of similar demises.

Bank runs 

A bank run occurs when many bank customers withdraw their deposits because they believe the bank might fail. There have been many runs on individual banks throughout history; for example, some of the 2008–2009 bank failures in the United States were associated with bank runs.

Banking panics and systemic banking crises

18th century 
Crisis of 1763, started in Amsterdam, begun by the collapse of Johann Ernst Gotzkowsky and Leendert Pieter de Neufville's bank, spread to Germany and Scandinavia 
British credit crisis of 1772-1773 in London and Amsterdam, begun by the collapse of the bankers Neal, James, Fordyce and Down.
Panic of 1792, New York
Panic of 1796–1797, Britain and United States

19th century 
Panic of 1819, a U.S. recession with bank failures; culmination of U.S.'s first boom-to-bust economic cycle
Panic of 1825, a pervasive British recession in which many banks failed, nearly including the Bank of England
Panic of 1837, a U.S. recession with bank failures, followed by a 5-year depression
Panic of 1847, United Kingdom
Panic of 1857, a U.S. recession with bank failures
Panic of 1866, Europe
Panic of 1873, a U.S. recession with bank failures, followed by a 4-year depression
Panic of 1884, United States and Europe
Panic of 1890, mainly affecting the United Kingdom and Argentina
Panic of 1893, a U.S. recession with bank failures
Australian banking crisis of 1893
Panic of 1896, acute U.S. recession

20th century 
Panic of 1901, a U.S. economic recession that started a fight for financial control of the Northern Pacific Railway
Panic of 1907, a U.S. economic recession with bank failures
Shōwa Financial Crisis, a 1927 Japanese financial panic that resulted in mass bank failures across the Empire of Japan.
Great Depression, the worst systemic banking crisis of the 20th century
Secondary banking crisis of 1973–1975 in the UK
Japanese asset price bubble (1986–2003)
Savings and loan crisis of the 1980s and 1990s in the U.S.
1988–1992 Norwegian banking crisis
Finnish banking crisis of 1990s
Sweden financial crisis 1990–1994
Rhode Island banking crisis
Peruvian banking crisis of 1992
Venezuelan banking crisis of 1994
1997 Asian financial crisis
 Enping financial crisis
1998 collapse of Long-Term Capital Management
1998 Russian financial crisis
1998–2002 Argentine great depression
1998–1999 Ecuador economic crisis

21st century 
2002 Uruguay banking crisis
2003 Myanmar banking crisis
Financial crisis of 2007–2008, including:
Subprime mortgage crisis in the U.S. starting in 2007
2008 United Kingdom bank rescue package
2009 United Kingdom bank rescue package
2008–2009 Belgian financial crisis
2008–2011 Icelandic financial crisis
Great Recession in Russia
2008–2009 Ukrainian financial crisis
2008–2014 Spanish financial crisis
Post-2008 Irish banking crisis
Venezuelan banking crisis of 2009–2010
Ghana banking crisis of 2017–2018
2023 United States banking crisis
2023 global banking crisis

See also 
List of economic crises
List of bank runs

References 

Taylor, Alan M. The great leveraging. NBER 18290

Notes 

Finance lists

Banking-related lists